Polio Children is an international non-governmental organization which has fundraised over £1.3million to fund projects in India, Tanzania, South Sudan and Sierra Leone which enhance the welfare of children with poliomyelitis. The charity has provided scholarships, vocational training and material assistance to polio victims across the world to ensure they can live dignified, independent lives.

Origins

In 1938, Vaghjibhai Ranchodbhai Patel, a 17-year-old son of a poor farmer in Gujarat, India completed his high school education. Yet despite passing with outstanding grades he was unable to pursue further studies because of his family’s poor economic situation.

However, he was determined that his children would not face the same fate and subsequently supported their education at any cost. The overriding message emitted by Vaghjibhai Patel that education is the only key to gain freedom from poverty was never far from the minds of his 3 sons. It was therefore no surprise that in late 2002 when Arun Patel, a polio sufferer himself, came across a newspaper article on a boarding school looking after poor and polio ridden children in Rajasthan, India, the three of them decided to visit to evaluate what help could be provided.

This first visit to the school (SKSN - Sucheta Kriplani Shiksha Niketan) left them with an overwhelming desire to help change the lives of those children for good. Hence, they immediately proceeded to set up Polio Children as a registered charity in the UK and the USA.
Since its formation in 2003, Polio Children, with the help of thousands of friends and well wishers from around the world has continued to work in partnership with its Indian and African counterparts to educate the poor and physically challenged children so they could all look forward to a life of hope and dignity.

Founding Trustees

In addition to founding Polio Children and the OKAS Fund, Arun Patel is a trustee of the Isha Foundation. He is a retired chartered accountant and was a member of the ICAEW.  He remains active with Rotary International through the Rotary Club of Dagenham in London.

Dr. Shirish Patel is also a founding trustee of Polio Children and the OKAS Fund. He obtained his medical degree from the Maharaja Sayajirao University of Baroda, and is a member of the Royal College of Physicians. He is currently a Clinical Associate Professor at the University of Rochester specialising in psychiatry.

Mayoor Patel attended Marlborough College and the Chelsea College of Science and Technology before attaining his degree from Surrey University. As well as founding Polio Children and the OKAS Fund along with his brothers, Mayoor Patel is also on the National Advisory Council for Milapfest, an Indian Arts Development Trust. He has also been involved with the Little Drops Shravana Project since 2007 (for the hearing impaired), a charity which aims to improve health and education in developing countries.

Projects
Polio Children currently supports projects in India, Tanzania and South Sudan, with projects pending to begin in Sierra Leone.

India

Polio Children work in partnership with the Indiability Foundation to support the Sucheta Kriplani Shiksha Niketan (SKSN) Institute in Jodhpur, Rajasthan. Since its inception in 1991 the SKSN institute has flourished from educating just 15 disabled boys into a boarding school now holding over 200 disabled and able-bodied boys and girls. Polio Children’s fundraising efforts, along with generous donations from other organisations around the world, have enabled the school to build a computer lab, a library and a prosthetics laboratory where, funds permitting, bespoke artificial limbs can be manufactured.

Polio Children's most significant contribution to SKSN was the construction of a girls hostel to provide accommodation for the female students of the school. The 140-bed Academic Training and Vocational Centre for Girls was opened in 2004 and enabled the school to enrol over three times as many female students who were previously unable to travel to classes each day. Polio Children also fund a scholarship program allowing over 220 graduates to attend higher education institutions where they train to become doctors, engineers and teachers who often return to SKSN to teach the current crop of students.

Janak Singh, a previous student of SKSN who now teaches at the school, went on to represent India in the mini Para Olympic Games held in England in 2009. Despite suffering from polio, he won 5 gold medals for his outstanding cricketing ability.

Tanzania
Polio Children also works in partnership with the Kwa Mkono Disabled Children’s Trust to support the Kwa Mkono Disabled Children's Centre (formerly known as The Kwa Mkono Polio Hostel). The hostel offers rehabilitation, education and training to physically disabled young people which allows them to live independently when they leave. Polio Children supports an ongoing education programme for the academically-abled hostel residents, and has donated agricultural vehicles to help cultivate nearby land for self-sufficiency, along with a Land Rover for transport. Funds have also been provided to improve the infrastructure and security of the hostel with a perimeter fence and extension of the common room. In 2016, Polio Children funded the building of a new kitchen at the camp with energy efficient, low emissions stoves installed to reduce indoor air pollution. A polio sufferer at the camp expressed her gratitude at the donation by saying

South Sudan
Polio Children works with Building Minds in South Sudan (BMISS), a non-profit organisation that provides educational opportunities to villagers in the Republic of South Sudan. The organisation seeks to restore hope by providing an education for people adversely affected by conflict in Sudan.

Sierra Leone
Polio Children is working with the Magbenteh Polio Camp in Makeni to establish self-sustaining revenue generating projects. Despite the challenges presented by the ongoing Ebola crisis, in 2016 Polio Children contributed to the rehabilitation of the camp by donating cooking equipment and food.

Kenya
In 2016, Polio Children worked in partnership with the Olympia Wafula Foundation, a charity established by paralympian Anne Wafula Strike, which promotes social inclusion and empowerment of differently-abled and disadvantaged persons. Together they provided tricycles for polio sufferers living in remote areas of Kenya.

Awards and recognition

In 2012 the chairman, Arun Patel, was chosen as one of only 7 Paralympic torchbearers to carry the National Flame of England, and has been honoured by both the British Citizen Awards and the Redbridge Cultural Association for his philanthropic work with the charity. Arun has also been nominated and shortlisted for both the Asian Achievers Award (2008, 2015) and World of Children Awards (2014, 2015). In addition, his brother Mayoor Patel was also nominated for the British Polio Fellowship Awards in 'Helper of the Year' category in 2008. 

In November 2015, the UK Prime Minister David Cameron awarded Arun & Mayoor Patel the Points of Light Award to recognise the positive impact the charity has had on polio afflicted children across the world. The Prime Minister said:

In January 2016, The Independent reported that UK founding trustee Mayoor Patel was to be recognised in the British Citizen Awards. Mayoor Patel was awarded a BCA in the International Achievement category as a result of his endeavours to allow children disadvantaged by poverty to access university education.

Polio Children was selected as a winner at the 2016 Asian Voice Charity Awards powered by Charity Clarity in recognition of their fundraising endeavours to support their portfolio of projects. In July 2016, Polio Children was also a finalist in the Charity Initiative of the Year category of the British Indian Awards. The awards recognise the commitment and hard work of the Indian community in contributing to a better society.

Fundraising
As a charity, Polio Children relies heavily on voluntary contributions from members of the public and philanthropic organisations. The trustees of the charity bear all the administration costs themselves ensuring 100% of the donations can be spent on the projects the charity supports.

References 

Medical and health organizations based in New York (state)
Polio
Medical and health organisations based in the United Kingdom
Foreign charities operating in India
Foreign charities operating in Tanzania